Isak Mikal Saba (15 November 1875 – 1 June 1921) was a Norwegian Sámi teacher and politician. He was born in 1875 in Nesseby, Norway to Per Sabasen and Bigi Henriksdatter Aikio. Saba married Marie Gunneva Hansdatter Holm (1876–1961), daughter of Hans Holm Olsen and Marit Gulbrandsdatter. On 11 October 1906 he became the first Sámi to be elected to the Stortinget (Norwegian parliament), and he was the representative of Finnmark for the Norwegian Labour Party from 1907 to 1912. He was the mayor of Nesseby from 1914 to 1915. After serving as mayor, he worked as a teacher until his death.
 

Saba wrote the text to Sámi soga lávlla, which the Sámi Conference made the Sami national anthem in 1986.

Saba died in 1921 in Vardø.

References

Further reading 

 Eriksen, Leif (1975): Isak Saba, stortingsmannen, thesis, University of Oslo
 Lindstøl, Tallak (1914): Stortinget og Statsraadet 1814-1914. Kristiania
 Zachariassen, Ketil (2012): "Isak Saba, Anders Larsen og Matti Aikio – ein komparasjon av dei samiske skjønnlitterære pionerane i Norge" (PDF), Nordlit 29

External links 

1875 births
1921 deaths
Norwegian Sámi people
People from Nesseby
Norwegian Sámi politicians
Norwegian Sámi-language writers
Norwegian Sámi activists
Labour Party (Norway) politicians
Members of the Storting